Riverview Park is a historic prairie style public park located at Hannibal, Marion County, Missouri.  It was established in 1909, and built through 1929 according to plans developed by noted landscape architect Ossian C. Simonds.  The park includes the caretaker's house (1880s), three scenic overlooks with retaining walls, the concrete stairway, the driving path, the logging road, the statue of Mark Twain (1913), and the memorial stone and plaque.  The park encircles the 17 acres that form the city's Water Department's facilities.

It was added to the National Register of Historic Places in 2005.

References

Parks on the National Register of Historic Places in Missouri
1909 establishments in Missouri
Buildings and structures in Hannibal, Missouri
National Register of Historic Places in Marion County, Missouri